Mizanur Rahman Khan (October 1967 – 11 January 2021) was a Bangladeshi journalist.

Life
He was born in October 1967, in Nalchiti, Jhalokathi, and died of COVID-19-related complications in Dhaka in January 2021, during the COVID-19 pandemic in Bangladesh.

He studied accounting at BM College in Barishal, before turning to a career in journalism. He spent more than three decades as a journalist at newspapers such as Samakal, Jugantor, and Mukto Kantho. He rose to be joint editor of the national daily Prothom Alo.

Khan gained renown for his analysis of the constitution, and of legal and judicial matters. His first book on the judiciary was published in 1995. His notable books include "Shongbidhan Ebong Tottabodhayak Sarkar Niye Bitorko" (1995), "Bangladesh-er Rajneetir Shonkoter Boishisto" (2003), "Tattabadhayak Sarkar: Oshubho Chinho" (2009), "1971 American Gopon Potro" (2006), and "American Nothigulite Mujib Hotya" (2013).

Khan was also a researcher of the 1971 liberation war.

References

Bangladeshi journalists
Deaths from the COVID-19 pandemic in Bangladesh
2021 deaths
1967 births